Ras Atiya is a Palestinian town in the Qalqilya Governorate in the western area of the West Bank, located 27 km south of Tulkarm and 11 km south of Qalqiliya. According to the Palestinian Central Bureau of Statistics, the village had a population of approximately 1,599 inhabitants in 2006.

Location
Ras ‘Atiya (including Ras at Tira and Wadi ar Rasha) is located 4-5 km south of Qalqiliya. It is bordered by ‘Izbat al Ashqar to the east,  Ad Dab’a to the east and south, ‘Izbat Jalud and Al Mudawwar to the south, Habla to the west, and An Nabi Elyas and ‘Arab Abu Farda to the north.

History
In 1882, the PEF's Survey of Western Palestine found at Kh. Ras et Tireh: "walls and cisterns."

Jordanian era
In the wake of the 1948 Arab–Israeli War, and after the 1949 Armistice Agreements, the area came under Jordanian rule.

In 1961, the population was  224.

Post-1967
After the Six-Day War in 1967,  the area  has been under Israeli occupation. 

After the 1995 accords, 32.2 % of Ras 'Atiya land is defined as Area B, while the remainder 67.8 % is Area C.  Under the same accord, 5% of Ras al-Tira  land is defined as Area B, while the remainder 95 % is Area C, while  100% of Wadi ar Rasha land is Area C,

Israel has confiscated 51 dunams of land from Ras at Tira  in order to construct the Israeli settlement of Alfei Menashe.

References

Bibliography

External links
 Welcome To Khirbat Ras Atiya
 Welcome To Kh. Ras al-Tira
Survey of Western Palestine, Map 14:    IAA,  Wikimedia commons
Ras 'Atiya (including Ras at Tira & Wadi ar Rasha Localities) (Fact Sheet), Applied Research Institute–Jerusalem, ARIJ
Ras ‘Atiya Village Profile (including Ras at Tira & Wadi ar Rasha Localities), ARIJ
Ras ‘Atiya, aerial photo, ARIJ
Development Priorities and Needs in Ras ‘ATiya (including Ras at Tira & Wadi ar Rasha Localities), ARIJ

Qalqilya Governorate
Villages in the West Bank
Municipalities of the State of Palestine